Weihua Jiang from the Nagaoka University of Technology, Nagaoka, Japan was named Fellow of the Institute of Electrical and Electronics Engineers (IEEE) in 2014 for contributions to repetitive pulsed power generation utilizing solid-state device technology.

References

Fellow Members of the IEEE
Living people
Year of birth missing (living people)
Place of birth missing (living people)
21st-century Japanese engineers